The Space Generation Advisory Council (SGAC), in support of the United Nations Programme on Space Applications, is a non-governmental organization and professional network that "aims to bring the views of students and young space professionals to the United Nations (UN), space industry, and other organizations." SGAC has the clear purpose of connecting, inspiring, engaging, and advocating; it works to raise awareness among the next generation of space professionals on a global scale. The SGAC network currently represents over 15,000 members across 150 countries - the world's largest network of students, young professionals, and alumni in the space industry. SGAC operates in the six official languages of the United Nations, though the official working language is English.

SGAC's core purpose is to be the voice of the "Space Generation" to the United Nations Office for Outer Space Affairs (UNOOSA) and other international organizations through its Observer Status with the United Nations Committee on the Peaceful Uses of Outer Space (UNCOPUOS). Since 2018, SGAC has also been an official Partner of the International Astronautical Federation (IAF). In these roles, the SGAC ensures the involvement and engagement of its membership in developing a progressive space policy that supports advancing humanity through the peaceful uses of space. The SGAC maintains that "the voice of students and young professionals should be heard in creating international space policy. As those who will be becoming the key policymakers, providers, and users of space, it is imperative that their opinion is taken into account." To ensure inclusivity, membership with SGAC is free of charge. The SGAC promises member benefits, including:

 Being a part of the voice of the next generation of space leaders to high-level leaders at the United Nations, national governments, space agencies, industry, and academia
 Access to high-energy and high-impact globally-oriented conferences, outreach events, and gatherings worldwide. Including networking events with strategic space industry partners
 Opportunity to contribute to multidisciplinary research groups / think tanks with topics such as Space and Cyber Security, Space Law and Policy, Space Exploration, Space Safety and Sustainability, and Space Medicine
 Exclusive access to scholarships, competitions, and travel awards
 Access to curated space news, including recent events, targeted job postings, and career development opportunities

As a non-profit organization, SGAC relies on the sponsorship and support of governmental, non-governmental, and industry organizations and support via donations from individuals. SGAC is continuously looking for general sponsors and project-based partners, striving to ensure that they reflect the diversity displayed by our organization.

History 
In December 1997, the UN Office of Outer Space Affairs Secretariat invited the International Space University (ISU) to organize a young adult forum as part of the UNISPACE III Conference in July 1999 in Vienna. The result was the Space Generation Forum (SGF), wherein 160 young people from 60 different countries discussed topics relating to the progress of space exploration, which included: science, engineering, technology, law, ethics, art, literature, anthropology, and architecture. More than 100 visions and ideas were generated during the conference, written as recommendations. The ten most impactful ideas were integrated into the "Declaration of the Space Generation, " approved by the UNISPACE III Plenary as the SGF's Technical Report (refer UN-Document A/Conf.184/L.14). Five of these ten recommendations were adopted into the Vienna Declaration on Space and Human Development. One of the recommendations was "to create a council to support the United Nations Committee on the Peaceful Uses of Outer Space by raising awareness and exchanging fresh ideas among young adults. The vision is to employ the creativity and vigor of younger generations in advancing humanity through the peaceful uses of space." From this, the Space Generation Advisory Council in Support of the United Nations Programme on Space Applications was established.

Since its establishment, SGAC has multiplied. In 2001 SGAC earned Permanent Observer status in UN COPUOS, and in 2003, SGAC earned consultative status with the United Nations Economic and Social Council. The organization officially opened its headquarters at the European Space Policy Institute (ESPI) in 2005 in Vienna and hired its first paid employee in 2006. Today, the organization's professional network comprises over 15,000 members from 168 countries (updated: 2020) in 6 different geographic regions.

Vision and Goal 
The guiding vision of SGAC is “to employ the creativity and vigor of young generations in advancing humanity through the peaceful uses of outer space.” Furthermore, the organization states that “[we] believe that the voice of students and young professionals should be heard in the creation of international space policy. As those who will be becoming the key policymakers, providers and users of space, we believe that it is imperative that their opinion is taken into account.”

The primary goal of SGAC is “to provide access to our members to inject their thoughts, views, and opinions on the direction of international space policy.” Other goals include:

 Undertaking projects on key topics of relevance to the SGAC members and to international space policy.
 Presenting university students and young professionals’ viewpoint around the world.
 Providing a dynamic forum in which university students and young professionals can expand their knowledge of international space policy issues, build networks, and think creatively about the future direction of humanity's use of space.

Organization 

SGAC is led by the SGAC Executive Council, which consists of two elected co-chairs as well as 12 elected regional coordinators (two per UN region). The Executive Council is supported by an appointed Executive Committee, which is made up of a treasurer, executive officer, two co-secretaries, and other executive team members. The rest of the organization is made up of the National Points of Contact, up to two per participating nation, and the 15,000 members who support the Space Generation Network.

A General Assembly is held annually and brings together the National Points of Contact and the Executive Council to approve or reject propositions introduced by the Executive Council and to change statutes of the organization.

SGAC works with many external space-related organizations from all around the world. The list of SGAC partners includes organizations from industry, government, academia, and other non-profits. A complete list of the sponsors and supporters is available on the SGAC website.

The organization receives advice from its advisory and honorary boards.

Advisory board 
SGAC's advisory board is designed to give strategic direction and advice to SGAC in order to help guide the organization in its fulfilment of its goals and objectives. It provides feedback on the work of the organization and suggests ways in which to improve its functions and its engagement. The board is composed of twelve board members, each of whom serves for a two-year term. The advisory board members are influential members of the international space community and are strong supporters of the SGAC’s goals and vision.

Honorary board 
SGAC’s honorary board is composed of distinguished individuals who have served the organization in the past and whom SGAC wishes to "recognixe for their furtherance of goals similar to those of SGAC."

Executive director 
SGAC’s executive director is in charge of:

 representing SGAC at international events and conferences such as the International Astronautical Congress (IAC) and the United Nations (particularly at the United Nations Committee on the Peaceful Uses of Outer Space annual sessions), 
 leading the development and execution of the SGAC strategy, 
 working closely with the SGAC teams on the development and facilitation of opportunities for SGAC's members in the space sector,
 mobilizing new partnerships, and, in particular, pursuing opportunities for funding in order to ensure financial sustainability for the organization.

Operations Manager 
SGAC’s Operations Manager will be accountable for supporting the management of SGAC operations.  This includes project planning, scheduling and managing, capacity and utilization management, delegating work to meet deliverables, and tracking the status of outstanding work from the different SGAC teams.

Chairs 
SGAC’s Co-Chairs are elected for a two-year mandate by the SGAC Executive Committee and are responsible for leading the Executive Committee and supervising the activities of the SGAC staff, contractual obligations, and financial activities.

Regional Coordinators 
SGAC’s Regional Coordinators are members of the SGAC Executive Committee. They coordinate activities in their region, oversee the work of the National Points of Contact, have voting rights on SGAC issues at the Executive Committee, and elect the Co-Chairs of the organization.

Activities

SGAC Involvement with the UN 
The SGAC impact reaches as far as our member base and as broad as our involvement in the space sector. The products of SGAC events and project groups shape space policy at every level and have been referenced by other delegations at UN COPUOS. The objective is to articulate and frame a new long-term vision for space that aligns with – to the greatest extent practicable and in a manner consistent with the United Nations Space Agenda – the views of the future generation of space leaders.

 UN Committee on the Peaceful Use of Outer Space (COPUOS). SGAC has Permanent Observer status in UN COPUOS and is regularly present at its annual meeting (in June) and at its two subcommittees' meetings: Legal (in March) and Scientific and Technical (in February). As one of only 20 Permanent Observers in COPUOS, SGAC contributes to the activities and action teams of COPUOS. SGAC contributes to the discussion by making statements and presentations on the various work that SGAC's network produces throughout the year. This includes the reporting of the recommendations gathered at the annual Space Generation Congress, the Space Generation Fusion Forum, and regional and local events.
 UN Office of Outer Space Affairs (OOSA). SGAC works together with OOSA in promoting UN workshops and in supporting SGAC members to attend various conferences around the world. SGAC’s partnership with OOSA is also manifested throughout its networks.
 UN Economic and Social Committee (ECOSOC). SGAC is proud to be a member of the UN Economic and Social Committee since 2003. In this position, SGAC attends the UN General Assembly every year and represents young professionals and university students in this important world forum. SGAC ECOSOC representatives report back on the important recommendations from all UN Member States.
 Space Generation Forum 2.0 (SGF 2.0). In 2018 the Space Generation Forum 2.0 was held to celebrate almost two decades since SGAC's first Space Generation Forum (now SGC) at UNISPACE III in 1999. The Forum was held in Vienna from the 16 to 17 of June 2018 as the international space community convened for the High Level Forum, UNISPACE+50 and the 61st session of COPUS. Seven working groups were created by taking into consideration the four pillars (Space Economy, Space Diplomacy, Space Society, Space Accessibility) and the seven Thematic Priorities that represent the framework in which UNISPACE +50 was developed.
 Space for Youth Competition. In 2019, the UN Office for Outer Space Affairs (UNOOSA) and the Space Generation Advisory Council (SGAC) launched the Space for Youth Competition for students and young professionals. The competition aims to bring new ideas and proposals to tackle climate challenges using space, thus contributing to the UN's Sustainable Development Goals (SDGs). At the UN level, youth development and youth engagement are cross-cutting issues in the 2030 Agenda for Sustainable Development. The UN Youth Strategy, launched by the Secretary General in September 2018, recognizes that young people’s empowerment, development, and engagement are goals as well as a means to build a better world.

Events 

 Space Generation Congress (SGC). The SGAC holds an annual event called the Space Generation Congress, which is held in conjunction with the International Astronautical Congress (IAC) organized by the International Astronautical Federation (IAF). The event is attended by approximately 150 top university students and young professionals with a passion for space. The attendees are SGAC members selected  through a competitive application process. With the Space Generation Congress, SGAC aims to hone and promote the voice of the university students and young professionals on the topic of international space development through the future leaders of the space sector. The Congress explores numerous themes including: agency, industry, society, exploration, and outreach. The results and recommendations of the congress are presented at the United Nations, during the UN COPUOS meetings of the following year. The Space Generation Congress is held in a different location every year. This is because the  Congress is held in conjunction with the International Astronautical Congress (IAC), which rotates on an annual basis.
 Space Generation Fusion Forum (SGFF). The inaugural Space Generation Fusion Forum took place in conjunction with the National Space Symposium on April 15 & 16, 2012 in Colorado, USA at The Broadmoor resort. The SGFF has since become an annual event in conjunction with the Space Symposium in Colorado, USA. The SGFF offers the next young generation of space sector leaders from government, industry, and academia the opportunity to come together to exchange views on current, hot space topics via interactive panels. The programme also allows these top delegates to network with each other as well as with today's current space leaders, who speak on and moderate  the panels. The Fusion Forum provides an ideal atmosphere for discussion about international collaboration since the participants come from all over the world.
 SGx. In partnership with Future Space Leaders Foundation (FSLF) and SATELLITE, SGx is a technology-focused event that will bring together young professionals, industry experts, and government leaders to discuss pressing issues and innovative ideas in an exciting way. Join us in a fast-paced and engaging discussion on cutting-edge space and satellite topics!
 Regional Events. The Space Generation Workshop series started with the aim of providing an opportunity to our members to share regional perspectives on space activities. They are large regional events that bring together students and young professionals to discuss current and upcoming space sector opportunities and challenges with a regional perspective. Through these workshops, SGAC aims to promote the voice of the next generation of space leaders in each of our six regions.
 Local Events. The increase of the SGAC local events, SG[Country], Partnered Events and Endorsed Events has led to engagement within many new countries. In turn, local events act as the backbone of SGAC activities in a country and greatly contribute to connect the global space community. Widening the introduction of national mailing lists and holding events has also helped National Points of Contact grow the local network that supports them in the past few years.
 Online Events. SGAC Project Groups, National Points of Contacts, and other SGAC team members regularly organize SGAC Webinars and other activities online. Webinars are a great way for SGAC to generate content for our online presence as well as to connect and engage with our global community. It also allows for a much broader audience and makes our activities accessible to everyone around the world.

Regional, Local, and Online Events can be organised by any SGAC members by submitting a proposal on the SGAC Events Platform.

Projects Groups 
SGAC is divided into several topical focus-groups, called Project Groups (PGs). Each PG is dedicated to a distinct space-related topic (see below) and serves as a platform within which the young space community can share their opinions, discuss, and debate current issues. This structure is designed to consolidate the expertise that exists within the SGAC network and draw in the targeted knowledge, skills and capabilities of young space leaders to bear on relevant topics for the peaceful advancement of space. This structure also ensures - and improves - coordination among the various segments of the organization.

As of 2020, the organization has a number of active projects:

 Commercial Space Project Group. The Commercial Space project group understands itself as a forum and “think tank” on topics regarding the commercial use and the vibrant commercialization of space activities for members of the young generation. The group’s research interests lay in 1) the Context of Commercial Space, 2) Commercial Space Models and Market Segments, 3) the Role of Policy and Law in Shaping the Commercial Space Industry, and 4) Business Models / Entrepreneurship. Besides academic research, the group’s goal is to motivate and support the involvement of young people in commercial space activities, through competitions, round tables, webinars and the like.
 Space Law and Policy Project Group. The Space Law & Policy Project Group was established in the summer of 2012 at the initiative of SGAC members pursuing legal training and building careers in the intersection of the legal profession and the space industry. Open to all members of the SGAC, the group will serve as a forum for interested young professionals and university students looking to work together to have their voices heard in the global discussion on the legal and policy aspects of outer space. Dedicated to investigating and addressing current issues in international and national space law and policy, and anticipating likely space law and policy issues in the coming decades, the Project Group will pursue projects relevant to the field of space law and policy, and to the broader international space community.
 Near Earth Object Project Group (NEO). The Near Earth Object Project Group is dedicated to helping the worldwide planetary defense community to meet one of nature’s greatest challenges. The group provides a youth perspective to planetary defense through annual reports, competitions, conference attendance, and public outreach projects related to Near Earth Objects.
 Space Safety and Sustainability Project Group (SSS). The space environment is an international domain and requires collaborative efforts from all space-faring nations to ensure the safety and sustainability of this environment. It is therefore essential that there is a wider awareness of an international culture of space safety and sustainability among the space community.  The  Space Safety and Sustainability Project Group will assist in building the highest possible degree of uniformity in regulations and standards, procedures, and organization regarding space safety and sustainability. This will be achieved through meetings, reports, conference presentations, competitions, and outreach projects.
 Small Satellites Project Group (SSPG). Small satellite programs are particularly attractive since they are “affordable”. There shall be no surprises in the near future, if more and more developing countries, groups from the academic world, or even small teams of space enthusiasts develop their own space mission based on small satellites. The small satellite platform is catering to new actors such as developing countries, students, and amateurs. The SGAC recognizes the changing landscape of space exploration using small satellites and initiated the Small Satellite Project Group.
 Space Exploration Project Group (SEPG). SGAC Space Exploration Project Group focuses on ongoing and future deep space crewed and un-crewed missions. The main goal of the group is to create an international and interdisciplinary forum focused on different aspects of space exploration, including: development of exploration technologies and capabilities; safety enhancement; performance of space, Earth and applied science; search for life; stimulation of economic expansion, and many more. The focus is the Global Exploration Roadmap (GER) currently being developed by 14 space agencies around the world. The GER Strategy reflects the international effort to prepare collaborative space exploration beginning with the International Space Station, continuing to the Moon, studying near-Earth asteroids, and with the ultimate goal of preparing for  a crewed mission to Mars.
 Ethics and Human Rights Project Group (EHR). The vision of this Project Group is to identify how space technology can best contribute to the realization of the United Nations’ objectives on Human Rights and the Sustainable Development Goals. At the same time, the project group will be a platform for the diversity of peoples who make up the space sector in order to help shape its development to be representative of all humanity.
 Space Medicine and Life Sciences Project Group (SMLS). The Space Medicine and Life Sciences Project Group aims to provide an international, inter-professional, and interdisciplinary platform for young professionals with an interest in space medicine and the life sciences. The group provides a conduit for students and young professionals to engage in the ongoing activities in the space medicine sector; to optimise human health on Earth, low-Earth orbit, and beyond. Moreover, SMLS aims to incubate and support ideas from the next generation to solve today’s health challenges.
 Space Technologies for Earth Applications (STEA). The Space Technologies for Earth Applications ( Project Group aims to provide a global and interdisciplinary forum for students and young professionals with an interest in the application of space technologies for improvement of life on Earth.
 Space & Cybersecurity. This project group follows the outcomes of the Space & Cybersecurity working group at the European Space Generation Workshop (ESGW) 2018, hosted in Bucharest, to emphasize the need to reflect on the nature of space and cybersecurity, what the priorities of governments and international institution should be, whether data should remain open source or limited in its availability, possible technical solutions to the challenges posed above, and the shape and origin of threats to cybersecurity in space.

Scholarships 
In SGAC's quest to increase youth input and engagement on international space issues, the organization works to provide financial resources for its members. The SGAC awards numerous scholarships throughout the year to university students and young professionals. These scholarships allow a greater number of members to take part in the international space policy creation process from attendance and presentations at UN COPUOS to participating in SGAC's annual congress, the International Astronautical Congress (IAC), or issue-specific seminars around the world. The Scholarship page of SGAC regularly publishes the available scholarship opportunities to attend the Space Generation Congress (SGC), International Astronautical Congress (IAC), Space Generation Fusion Forum (SGFF), Space Symposium (SS), Space Generation Workshops (SGWs) and other space events.

Professional Development 
With the exception of one paid staff - the SGAC Executive Director and SGAC Operations Manager -all leadership positions and members of SGAC serve the organization on a voluntary basis. SGAC posts vacancies every month which can be consulted on the SGAC vacancies page. Volunteering with SGAC  allows members to be recognized internationally as part of the organization’s leadership on the SGAC Team webpage and offers opportunities to develop as leaders in the space sector.

SGAC also offers space-related organizations the opportunity to post employment vacancies directly on the SGAC website through the SGAC Jobs Board.

Alumni and Mentoring Programme 
The SGAC Alumni Programme was launched at the Space Generation Forum 2.0 in 2018 (after a series of successful alumni activities from 2015-2018) to help reconnect with SGAC Alumni and use the potential of the SGAC alumni network to support other SGAC activities. SGAC Alumni are SGAC members (with a registered account on our website) who care about the SGAC mission and vision, but are over the age limit of SGAC (past their 36th birthday). SGAC organizes a series of activities to help connect its current members with the SGAC alumni and helps facilitate the sharing of knowledge and experiences in this context. These activities include SGAC Alumni Gatherings, SGAC: Through the Generations Event, Alumni Spotlight, and mentoring SGAC members as advisors to different projects.

At the Space Generation Forum 2.0 in June 2018 in Vienna, one of the key recommendations presented in recognition of the UNISPACE+50 is to foster development and support in the space sector through mentoring. In response, SGAC has created a Mentoring Program for its members. The aim of this program is to connect SGAC members with experts in the space field, especially through our vast network of SGAC Alumni. Through the Mentorship Program, SGAC hopes its members will be able to receive support and guidance as they continue to advance in their careers.

References

External links 
Space Generation Congress (English)

Space organizations
Organizations established in 1999
Space policy
1999 establishments in Austria